Davenport Green is a proposed tram stop in Davenport Green, Greater Manchester. It would serve the area of Davenport Green. It has been proposed since the early 2000s but was dropped in 2005 from the Manchester Airport Line on cost grounds.

References

Proposed Manchester Metrolink tram stops